Eremophila serpens, commonly known as snake eremophila, is a flowering plant in the figwort family, Scrophulariaceae and is endemic to Western Australia. It is a prostrate, creeping shrub with long, horizontal branches, leaves which often have irregular serrations, and yellowish-green petals with red or brownish-purple markings.

Description
Eremophila serpens is a prostrate shrub which often has long, snake-like branches which have short side-branches. The branches are glabrous and contact the ground along most of their length, often forming roots.

The petal tube is lime-green or yellowish-green, with red or brownish purple markings on the top lobe. The petal tube and its lobes are glabrous apart from some hairs on the lowest lobe and inside the tube. The 4 stamens extend beyond the end of the petal tube and are the most conspicuous part of the flowers.

Taxonomy and naming
The species was first formally described by Robert Chinnock in 1979 and the description was published in Journal of the Adelaide Botanic Garden. The specific epithet (serpens) is a Latin word meaning "snake", referring to the habit of this species.

Distribution and habitat
Eremophila serpens grows in sandy soil, often near the margins of salts lakes, between Hyden and Salmon Gums in the Avon Wheatbelt, Coolgardie, Esperance Plains and Mallee biogeographic regions.

Conservation
Snake eremophila is classified as "Priority Four" by the Western Australian Government Department of Parks and Wildlife, meaning that is rare or near threatened.

Use in horticulture
This eremophila makes an attractive understorey groundcover and attracts nectar-feeding birds. It can be easily propagated from cuttings and grown in a wide range of soils. It needs an occasional watering during a long dry spell and is frost-hardy.

References

serpens
Eudicots of Western Australia
Endemic flora of Western Australia
Plants described in 1979
Taxa named by Robert Chinnock